GCCC may refer to:

 Garden City Community College
 Gold Coast City Council
 Greater Columbus Convention Center
 Gloucestershire County Cricket Club